Get Gorgeous was an Indian reality television show and model talent search that premiered in 2004 by one of India's music channels, Channel V India.  The show was formatted by  Kaveri Mehrotra while Amar Deb was the head of the channel. Get Gorgeous was about discovering the next face of modeling in India.

Seasons

Get Gorgeous 1
The show's first season aired on July 1, 2004 with the finale on September 23, 2004. It had 6,000 entries received and 16 finalists were taken to the coast of Goa. The season was hosted by VJ Sarah-Jane Dias, with renowned fitness instructor Mickey Mehta, photographer Sameer Parekh, well-known choreographers Tanya LeFebvre and Aparna Behl, designer Aparna Chandra, make-up expert Ambika Pillai and Hemant Trivedi as judges.

The show's prizes for this season include walking for designer Suneet Verma at Rome Fashion Week and a contract with Elite Model Management in India. The four winners were Aarohi Mishra, Archana Vijaya, Natasha Suri and Tanvi Singh.

Contestants

Get Gorgeous 2
The second season first aired in April 23, 2005 with the finale in June 11, 2005 and it was hosted by season 1 winner Archana Vijaya. It had 5,000 entries received and 16 finalists were taken to the training camp at Taj Exotica in Bentota, Sri Lanka. The season had designers Hemant Trivedi, model Noyonika Chatterjee and model-turned-actor Milind Soman as judges.

The winner of the season was Priyanka Shah. She receive:

 A talent contract with Channel V India
 A modelling contract with Elite Model Management in India
 A campaign for LG CDMA
 Will be walking at India Fashion Week

Contestants

Get Gorgeous 3 
The third season first aired in March 16, 2006 and with the finale on May 4, 2006., and had fifteen finalists. The season was hosted by VJ Pia Trivedi, with model-turned-actor Dino Morea, model and ace fashion choreographer Marc Robinson, fashion designer Surily Goel, ace fashion choreographer Colston Julian, model Noyonika Chatterjee, and choreographer Rajiv Goswami as judges.

The prizes include: a talent contract with Channel V India and a modelling contract with Matrix Model Management in India. The winners of this season were Anurita Jha and Meenal Thakur.

Season 3 Contestants

Get Gorgeous 4 

The fourth season aired on June 7, 2007 and with the finale on August 9, 2007. The season's host was VJ Pia Trivedi, along with the judging panel were make-up artist Samantha Kochhar, Alison Kanuga and fashion designer duo Shantanu Mehra & Nikhil Mehra. The 10 finalists travelled to the Swaswara resort in Goa. The prizes include: a talent contract with Channel V India and a modelling contract with Elite Model Management in India. The winner of the season was Rachel Varghese.

The Grand Finale had over 1,000 guests visiting the live runway. The anchor of the live show was Channel V's VJ Pia Trivedi. During the taping of the season, Channel [V] allowed a blogger from Trendy.com to live among the contestants and collect exclusive behind-the-scenes material for a section of the show's website called “The Gorgeous Blogger”.

Contestants

Get Gorgeous 5 
The fifth season aired on May 16, 2008 and with the finale on July 26, 2008. This season was hosted again by VJ Pia Trivedi. Indian Supermodels Diandra Soares and Gauahar Khan were judges and their model mentor. The 10 finalists travelled to Kerala and the 3 finalist travelled to Paris. This season garnered an average of 10 million viewers, making it the highest rated season of the show's history.

The winner of the season was Iris Maity, beating Gwen Athaide and Salome Narayana Polaki in the finale. She receive:

 A talent contract with Channel V worth ₹1.000.000
 A modelling contract with ICE Model Management
 A trip to Paris to feature in a shoot for Christian Dior
 An exclusive splash feature in L'Officiel

Season 5 Contestants

Get Gorgeous 6 
The sixth season aired on August 29, 2010 and with the finale on November 21, 2010. This season was hosted by VJ Andy with the brand new judges were: model Kamal Sidhu, fashion photographer Vikram Bawa and fashion designer Gayatri Khanna, and 2 new mentor are supermodels Sahil Shroff & Archana Vijaya. After 2 years gap, the show return with 20 brand new contestant, including male contestant for the first time. The prizes include a 1-year modelling contract with Kwan Entertainment. The two winner of the season were Preeti Chauhan & Rajat Dahiya.

Contestant

Results

 The contestant was eliminated
 The contestant was eliminated outside of judging panel
 The contestant was immune from elimination
 The contestant won the competition

Challenges 

 Episode 2 photo shoots: Makeover
 Episode 3 photo shoot: Swimsuit calendar for MiD-DAY
 Episode 4 commercial: Garnier product in pair
 Episode 5 commercial: Garnier product
 Episode 6 photo shoot: Homosexuality couple
 Episode 7 photo shoot: Adam and Eve
 Episode 8 video shoot & commercial: Bollywood couple; Scooty Pep motorbike in group
 Episode 9 commercial & photo shoot: LG Cookie smartphone in group; Rags to riches editorial
 Episode 10 photo shoot: Love in the air
 Episode 11 photo shoot: Marico Hair & Care campaign
 Episode 12 commercial & photo shoot: Mumbai Underworld online game; Grazia editorial in pairs
 Episode 13 runway: India Fashion Week 2010

References

External links
Official website of Get Gorgeous (archive at the Wayback Machine)
Official website of Get Gorgeous 2 (archive at the Wayback Machine)
Official website of Get Gorgeous 3 (archive at the Wayback Machine)
Official website of Get Gorgeous 4 (archive at the Wayback Machine)
Official website of Get Gorgeous 5 (archive at the Wayback Machine)
Official website of Get Gorgeous 6 (archive at the Wayback Machine)

Indian reality television series
Makeover reality television series
Modeling-themed reality television series
2004 American television series debuts
2008 American television series endings